The Kango (Bakango), also known as the Batchua and Mbuti-Sua, are an Mbuti pygmy people of the Ituri forest. They speak a Bantu language, Bila, apparently in two dialects, northern Sua and southern Kango.

They are in a patron–vassal relationship with several Bantu-speaking peoples, the Bila, Budu, Ndaka, Bombo, Liko, and Baali; two Sudanic peoples, the Lese and Luumbi, and the Ubangian Mayogo.

They may be the Wochua people described in the 19th century.

References
Serge BAHUCHET, 2006. "Languages of the African Rainforest « Pygmy » Hunter-Gatherers: Language Shifts without Cultural Admixture." In Historical linguistics and hunter-gatherers populations in global perspective. Leipzig.

African Pygmies
Ethnic groups in the Democratic Republic of the Congo